Pisinidea is a moth genus of the family Depressariidae.

Species
 Pisinidea viridis Butler, 1883
 Pisinidea exsuperans (Meyrick, 1920)

References

Depressariinae